Constantin Mandrîcenco (born 19 February 1991) is a Moldovan footballer who plays for Armenian club Sevan FC as a midfielder. He has represented his country at under-21 international level.

He is a son of another footballer Nicolae Mandrîcenco. His brother Dmitri Mandrîcenco is also a footballer.

References

External links
Constantin Mandricenco at Dinamo-Auto

1991 births
Living people
Moldovan footballers
Moldovan expatriate footballers
Association football midfielders
People from Tiraspol
FC Sheriff Tiraspol players
FC Mika players
FC Tiraspol players
FC Impuls Dilijan players
Ulisses FC players
Hapoel Afula F.C. players
FC Dinamo-Auto Tiraspol players
FK Dinamo Samarqand players
Speranța Nisporeni players
FC Tighina players
FC Florești players
Sevan FC players
Moldovan Super Liga players
Armenian Premier League players
Liga Leumit players
Uzbekistan Super League players
Moldovan expatriate sportspeople in Armenia
Moldovan expatriate sportspeople in Israel
Moldovan expatriate sportspeople in Uzbekistan
Expatriate footballers in Armenia
Expatriate footballers in Israel
Expatriate footballers in Uzbekistan